Castanopsis fargesii Is an evergreen tree that grows 10–30 m tall.

The Latin specific epithet fargesii refers to  the French missionary and amateur botanist Père Paul Guillaume Farges (1844–1912).

Habitat and distribution
Found in evergreen broad-leaved evergreen forests at 200-2,100 m elevation in Anhui, Fujian, Guangdong, Guangxi, Guizhou, Hubei, Hunan, Jiangsu, Jiangxi, Sichuan, Taiwan, Yunnan and Zhejiang.

Uses
The nuts contain a high quality edible starch. The bark is used to create dyes, and the hardwood has construction and cabinetry applications.

References

fargesii
Trees of China